Unhocomo is the westernmost island in the Bissagos archipelago of Guinea-Bissau. It forms part of the Sector of Uno. In 2009 its population was 678. It lies 15 km west of Uno.

References

Bolama Region
Bissagos Islands